Rev. Dr. Neiliezhü Üsou Memorial Award for Music is a prestigious music award given annually by the Rev. Dr. Neiliezhü Üsou Memorial Society and approved by the Nagaland Board of School Education (NBSE). The award is named after the late Rev. Dr. Neiliezhü Üsou for his tremendous contribution to the growth of music in Nagaland. It was instituted in 2009 and is an annual recognition given to the HSLC subject topper in Music under NBSE. This award carries a citation and cash money of 15,000 (Fifteen thousand Indian Rupees). Cash money was revised to 25,000 (Twenty Five thousand Indian Rupees) in 2020.

Award recipients 

† Multiple subject toppers in that year. All recipients are awarded 15,000 (revised to 25,000 in 2020) along with citation and memento.

References

External links 
 Nagaland Board of School Education (NBSE) official website
 Sesino Savino awarded "Rev. Dr. Neiliezhü Üsou Memorial Award for Music" 2009 Eastern Mirror
 HSLC music topper awarded Nagaland Post
 Ms. Tingneineng Vaiphei awarded "Rev. Dr. Neiliezhü Üsou Memorial Award for Music" 2010 Manipur Express
 Ms. Zekope-u of G. Rio School receives the prestigious Rev. Dr. Neiliezhu Usou Memorial Award for Music 2011 The Morung Express
 ‘Nagas second to none in music': 3rd giving away ceremony of late Rev. Dr. Neiliezhü Usou Memorial Award for Music Nagaland Post
 Angel Ngüllie receives Rev Neiliezhü Üsou Memorial Award for Music Eastern Mirror retrieved 01-07-2012
 C.L. John, MLA & Chairman, MARCOFED Nagaland gives away the Rev. Dr. Neiliezhü Usou Memorial Award for Music to Angel Ngullie of Pilgrim School Morung Express retrieved 01-07-2012
 Rio inaugurates primary school in Kohima Eastern Mirror retrieved 31-07-2013
 Kezekevinuo wins Neiliezhu's music memorial award Eastern Mirror 08-06-2014
5 students receive Rev. Dr. Neiliezhü Üsou’s Memorial Award for Music Morung Express 14-06-2015
Emtili Aier awarded with Rev. Dr. Neiliezhü Usou Memorial Award Eastern Mirror 16-06-2016
Neingusalie Yano Awarded Rev. Dr. Neiliezhü Üsou’s Memorial Nagaland Post 18-06-2017
Three receives Rev. Dr. Neiliezhü Üsou’s Memorial Award for Music Morung Express 08-09-2018
School of Music Kohima golden jubilee Nagaland Post 03-09-2019
Ketuseno wins Neiliezhu Usou memorial award in music Eastern Mirror 11-10-2020
Yimlimongla Pongen receives Rev Dr Neiliezhü Usou’s Memorial Award for music Morung Express 29-10-2021

Culture of Nagaland
Awards established in 2009